Sardar Aamir Talal Khan Gopang is a Pakistani politician who has been a member of the National Assembly of Pakistan since August 2018. Previously he was a Member of the Provincial Assembly of the Punjab, from May 2013 to May 2018.

Early life
He was born in 1970.

Political career
He was elected to the Provincial Assembly of the Punjab as a candidate of PML-Q from Constituency PP-261 (Muzaffargarh-XI) in 2008 Pakistani general election.

He was re-elected to the Provincial Assembly of the Punjab as an independent candidate from Constituency PP-261 (Muzaffargarh-XI) in 2013 Pakistani general election. He joined Pakistan Muslim League (N) (PML-N) in May 2013.

In December 2013, he was appointed as Parliamentary Secretary for special education.

In May 2018, he quit PML-N and joined Pakistan Tehreek-e-Insaf (PTI).

He was elected to the National Assembly of Pakistan as a candidate of PTI from Constituency NA-186 (Muzaffargarh-VI) in 2018 Pakistani general election.

External Link

More Reading
 List of members of the 15th National Assembly of Pakistan

References

Living people
Punjab MPAs 2013–2018
1970 births
Pakistan Muslim League (N) politicians
Pakistani MNAs 2018–2023
People from Muzaffargarh
Politicians from Muzaffargarh